Oxyalcia is a monotypic snout moth genus described by Paul Dognin in 1905. Its only species, Oxyalcia mira, was described by Herbert Druce in 1902 and is known from Ecuador.

References

Moths described in 1902
Epipaschiinae
Monotypic moth genera
Moths of South America
Pyralidae genera